10th NYFCO Awards
December 12, 2010

Best Film: 
 The Social Network 
The 10th New York Film Critics Online Awards, honoring the best in filmmaking in 2010, were given on 12 December 2010.

Winners
Best Actor:
James Franco - 127 Hours as Aron Ralston
Best Actress:
Natalie Portman - Black Swan as Nina Sayers
Best Animated Film:
Toy Story 3
Best Cast:
The Kids Are All Right
Best Cinematography
Black Swan - Matthew Libatique
Best Debut Director:
John Wells - The Company Men
Best Director:
David Fincher - The Social Network
Best Documentary Film:
Exit Through the Gift Shop
Best Film:
The Social Network
Best Film Music or Score:
Black Swan - Clint Mansell
Best Foreign Language Film:
I Am Love • Italy
Best Screenplay:
Aaron Sorkin - The Social Network
Best Supporting Actor:
Christian Bale - The Fighter as Dicky Eklund
Best Supporting Actress:
Melissa Leo - The Fighter as Alice Eklund
Breakthrough Performer:
Noomi Rapace - The Girl with the Dragon Tattoo

Top Ten Pictures of 2010
 127 Hours
 Another Year
 Black Swan
 Blue Valentine
 The Ghost Writer
 Inception
 The Kids Are All Right
 The King's Speech
 Scott Pilgrim vs. the World
 The Social Network

References

New York Film Critics Online Awards
2010 film awards
2010 in American cinema